Mektoub is a 1997 French-Moroccan drama film directed by Nabil Ayouch. The film was selected as the Moroccan entry for the Best Foreign Language Film at the 71st Academy Awards, but was not accepted as a nominee.

Cast
 Rachid El Ouali as Dr. Taoufik Raoui
 Faouzi Bensaïdi as Kamel Raoui
 Amal Chabli as Sophia Raoui
 Mohammed Miftah as Inspector Kabir
 Malika Oufkir as The Village Chief

See also
 List of submissions to the 71st Academy Awards for Best Foreign Language Film
 List of Moroccan submissions for the Academy Award for Best Foreign Language Film

References

External links
 

1997 films
1997 drama films
French drama films
Moroccan drama films
1990s Arabic-language films
Films directed by Nabil Ayouch
1990s French films